Antelope Valley College (AVC) is a public community college in Lancaster, California. It is part of the California Community College system. It is operated by the Antelope Valley Community College District, with a primary service area of  covering portions of Los Angeles and Kern counties. Instruction is offered at several sites, including Palmdale and Lancaster, and through online and instructional television courses.

The college offers Associate in Arts and Associate in Science degrees in 71 fields as well as certificate programs in 59 vocational areas.

The main campus in Lancaster hosts the satellite location of California State University, Bakersfield-Antelope Valley (CSUB-AV), where students can obtain bachelor's and master's degrees in select subjects.

History 

The institution began classes on September 10, 1929, as a department of Antelope Valley High School in Lancaster. It was established as Antelope Valley Junior College, providing the first two years of a college education for those living in what was then a remote, rural area. The name was later modified to Antelope Valley College to reflect it comprehensive nature. The average daily attendance at the college was 13 during the 1929–30 school year.

There was little growth in enrollment at the college during the depression years that followed. Alfalfa farmers in Antelope Valley were hard hit during the 1930s, and the smallest junior college in California suffered serious financial difficulties. Teachers took a 20 percent cut in salaries, which ranged from a state-mandated minimum of $1,350 a year to a $1,595 maximum.

Average daily attendance (ADA) at the college reached 100 by 1939, but with World War II, attendance plummeted. Attendance reached a low of 13 during the war, the same ADA as the year the school was founded.

There were pressures to close the junior college, but trustees and staff held out until veterans returned from the war. Enrollment grew steadily during the postwar years, partly because of the GI Bill of Rights and partly because Antelope Valley began developing an aircraft industry.

The college campus has expanded to approximately  through land purchases.

Academics 

Antelope Valley College has grown to a student population of approximately 16,000. It is accredited by the Accrediting Commission for Community and Junior Colleges.

Among the many programs offered through the college are an associate degree program in registered nursing approved by the Board of Registered Nursing, an airframe and powerplant technician program certified by the Federal Aviation Administration, and a lower division engineering program that co-ordinates with an engineering degree program offered locally through California State University, Long Beach. Other programs include aircraft fabrication and assembly (including composite materials), computer graphics, respiratory therapy, Firefighter I Academy and wildland fire technology.

In conjunction with the Los Angeles County Sheriff's Department, the Lancaster campus hosts the Sheriff's Training Academy, which meets the requirements of the Peace Officer Standards and Training for training members of the sheriff's department and other law enforcement agencies.
  
The community college district is governed by a locally elected Board of Trustees consisting of five members serving four-year terms, plus a student trustee elected annually by members of the student body.

Palmdale campus
The college maintains a temporary leased site in the City of Palmdale, which serves nearly 2,000 students. Officials in April 2009 expressed their intent to submit an initial project proposal for a campus to the state in June 2010.

Athletics 
The college's athletic teams are known as the Marauders. The college currently fields eight men's and eight women's varsity teams. It competes as a member of the California Community College Athletic Association (CCCAA) in the Western State Conference (WSC) for all sports except football, which competes in Southern California Football Association (SCFA).

Notable alumni
Kevin Appier, former MLB pitcher
Jim Bruske, former MLB pitcher
Brodus Clay, former WWE wrestler
DeAndra Cobb, former running back
Dave Cox, California State Senator, 1st District
Kevin Curtis, founder and chief technology officer, InPhase Technologies
Dewayne Dedmon, professional basketball player
Greg Floyd Jr., professional basketball player
Steve Knight, U.S. Congressman, California 25th District
Tony Reed, former running back
James Richards, former Canadian Football League offensive guard
Isaiah Rider, former professional basketball player
Kay Ryan, Poet Laureate, Library of Congress, July 2008 – 2010
Jim Slaton, former Milwaukee Brewers pitcher

References

External links

California Community Colleges
Education in Palmdale, California
Two-year colleges in the United States
Educational institutions established in 1929
Schools accredited by the Western Association of Schools and Colleges
College
Buildings and structures in Lancaster, California
Education in Lancaster, California
1929 establishments in California